Mirjaveh County is in Sistan and Baluchestan province, Iran. The capital of the county is the city of Mirjaveh. At the 2006 census, the region's population (as Mirjaveh District of Zahedan County) was 45,896 in 8,481 households. The following census in 2011 counted 39,873 people in 9,385 households. The district was separated from Zahedan County in 2013 to become Mirjaveh County. At the 2016 census, the county's population was 45,357 in 11,853 households. The county is bordered by both Pakistan and Afghanistan.

Administrative divisions

The population history and structural changes of Mirjaveh County's administrative divisions over three consecutive censuses are shown in the following table. The latest census shows two districts, seven rural districts, and one city.

References

 

Counties of Sistan and Baluchestan Province